Kalker is a German- and Dutch-language occupational surname for a lime burner (cf. Chalker,  Kolker, Kalkbrenner). It may refer to:
Joost Jacques Kalker (1933–2006), Dutch mechanical engineer
Martha Vonk-van Kalker (1943–2022), Dutch politician

References 

German-language surnames
Dutch-language surnames
Occupational surnames